The word incubation may refer to:

Science and technology
 Egg incubation, sitting on or brooding the eggs of birds and other egg-laying animals to hatch them
 Incubation (psychology), the process of thinking about a problem subconsciously while being involved in other activities
 Incubation period, medical term for the time between being exposed to infection and showing first symptoms
 Incubator (culture), a device used to grow and maintain course of cell cultures

Arts and entertainment
 Incubate (festival), an annual independent culture festival in Tilburg, The Netherlands
 Incubation: Time Is Running Out, 1997 turn-based tactics computer game from Blue Byte
 "Incubation", song released on the B-side of the Komakino flexi-single in 1980, and on the Substance (Joy Division album) in 1988
 Biohazard 4 Incubate, a 97-minute DVD detailing the story of Resident Evil 4

Religion and spirituality
 Dream incubation, practiced technique of learning to "plant a seed" in one's mind for a specific dream topic to occur
 Incubation (ritual), a religious practice of sleeping in a sacred area with the intention of experiencing a divinely inspired dream or cure
 Salaat-ul-Istikhaarah, an Islamic prayer with the intention of searching for guidance for a decision or issue

Other uses
Business incubator, a company that helps new and startup companies to develop by providing services such as management training or office space

See also
Incubator (disambiguation)
Early feeding